Wu Jingyu (born February 1, 1987) is a female Chinese Taekwondo practitioner who won gold medals at the 2008 and 2012 Summer Olympics in the –49 kg class. She also won several medals at world championships and Asian Games.

Biography
Wu Jingyu started training in taekwondo aged 13. Her signature moves are axe kicks. As of 2012 she was a student at the Tianjin University of Technology and Suzhou University of Science and Technology. Her hobbies are music, movies and drawing sayings on porcelain. Her hometown in Jiangxi Province is known as "China's porcelain capital", and her uncle is a porcelain maker. She played a young taekwondo fan who dreams of becoming a champion in a Chinese movie on Taekwondo.

See also
 China at the 2012 Summer Olympics#Taekwondo
 Taekwondo at the 2012 Summer Olympics - Women's 49 kg

References

External links

 

1987 births
Living people
Chinese female taekwondo practitioners
Olympic gold medalists for China
Olympic taekwondo practitioners of China
Athletes from Jiangxi
People from Jingdezhen
Taekwondo practitioners at the 2008 Summer Olympics
Asian Games medalists in taekwondo
Olympic medalists in taekwondo
Taekwondo practitioners at the 2012 Summer Olympics
Taekwondo practitioners at the 2016 Summer Olympics
Sportspeople from Jiangxi
Taekwondo practitioners at the 2006 Asian Games
Taekwondo practitioners at the 2010 Asian Games
Medalists at the 2012 Summer Olympics
Medalists at the 2008 Summer Olympics
Taekwondo practitioners at the 2014 Asian Games
Asian Games gold medalists for China
Asian Games bronze medalists for China
Medalists at the 2006 Asian Games
Medalists at the 2010 Asian Games
Medalists at the 2014 Asian Games
Universiade medalists in taekwondo
Universiade gold medalists for China
World Taekwondo Championships medalists
Asian Taekwondo Championships medalists
Medalists at the 2005 Summer Universiade
Taekwondo practitioners at the 2020 Summer Olympics
21st-century Chinese women